Statue of David Farragut may refer to:

 Statue of David Farragut (Boston)
 Statue of David Farragut (New York City)
 Statue of David Farragut (Washington, D.C.)